Raed El Khazen, also known as REK, is a Lebanese guitarist, singer, songwriter, record producer and film score composer. He is primarily known for his fusion of blues, funk and rock, as well as his versatile jazz guitar playing with a distinctive sound influenced by oriental and other world music – best represented on his album Ghosts and Shadows, released in 2016.

His tour history includes performing in a very few countries including his native Lebanon as well as United States, Brazil, Jordan, United Arab Emirates, Morocco, Tunisia, Algeria, Egypt, Kuwait, Syria and Guinea Equatorial.

Musical career
Born in Lebanon and raised there during the 15-year Lebanese Civil War, Raed El Khazen began playing guitar at the age of nineteen. El Khazen played small gigs in Beirut while studying to be a Civil Engineer and in 1992 dropped out of university to pursue a musical career. He was attracted to blues guitarists like Jimi Hendrix, Albert King, Albert Collins, Stevie Ray Vaughan and David Gilmour and initially mostly played blues driven music.

In 1996, El Khazen attend Berklee College of Music in Boston, Massachusetts. There, he discovered the music of Thelonious Monk, Miles Davis, Charlie Parker, Sonny Rollins, Wes Montgomery and Grant Green. He learned Jazz and improvised music and dedicated the ten years to follow to studying various periods in the history of jazz and African-American music.
He studied privately with John Abercrombie and attended several master classes and clinics by the likes of Pat Metheny, John Scofield, Pat Martino, Wayne Krantz and others.

After graduating, he moved to New York City where he resided and worked from 2000 to 2010. There, El Khazen played with his contemporaries and some well-established artists like Avishai Cohen, Daniele Camarda, Jojo Meyer, Kermit Driscoll, Marko Djordjevic, Derek Neirvelgelt, Manu Koch, Stephane Mercier, Ben Zwerin, Juancho Herrera, Chris Cheek, Zach Jones, Gavin Degraw, Marcus Wolf, Anna Laura Freedman, John Hicks, René McLean, Barbara Sfraga, Gilmar Gomes, Bras Mason, David Vierra, Aaron Johnston, Didi Gutman, Jesse Murphy, Fredrik Rubens, Franco Pinna and others.

He was the leader of New Light Quartet with Avishai Cohen (trumpet), Daniele Camarda (bass guitar) and Marko Djordjevic (drums). The formation recorded original music under an officially unreleased record "Shadow Hunting".

In 2008, he recorded an album "Losing My Reality" with a New York rock band Running Still for East West Records owned by Warner Music Group, unfortunately the album was never published.

In 2010, Raed moved back to Beirut and for the next six years mainly produced young Arab artists, including Mashrou' Leila, Tanjaret Daghet and Hello Psychaleppo. At that time, Raed El Khazen also wrote music for film and TV, including The Mountain (2010) by Ghassan Salhab; Blind Intersections (2012) by Lara Saba, and Yalla Aa'belkon (2015) by Elie Khalife.

El Khazen independently recorded his album "Ghosts And Shadows", with musicians Walid Sadek (trumpet), Tarek Khuluki (member of Tanjaret Daghet, synths), Dani Shukri (member of Tanjaret Daghet, drums) and Derek Nievergelt (bass/production). The songs are best described as visual sonic explorations blending Arab culture and a Western instrument.

Rekloose
Raed El Khazen took on singing and songwriting in October 2019. He started performing on stage as Rekloose Blues Band in December 2019 with Khaled Omran (member of Tanjaret Daghet, bass guitar), Dani Shukri (member of Tanjaret Daghet, drums) and Christopher Ibrahim (keyboards). El Khazen recorded the first Rekloose demo track "The Final Project" in January 2020 at Studio Addicts in Beirut, Lebanon. The official band name was eventually shortened to Rekloose.

The only consistent members of the formation are Raed El-Khazen (guitar / vocals) and Ben Zwerin (bass guitar). Other musicians participating on the recordings are Liset Alea (back vocals), Oskar Haggdahl (drums), Aaron Johnston (drums), Eric Finland (keyboard) and others.

The first official song "Fall From Grace" was released on July 29, 2020, the second "Nothing To Do" was released on August 7, 2020.

Song Releases

References 

1973 births
Living people
21st-century Lebanese male singers
Arab musicians
Lebanese guitarists
Lead guitarists
Blues rock musicians
Electric blues musicians
Contemporary blues musicians
Warner Records artists